St. Denis Ssebugwawo Secondary School is a Ugandan mixed day and boarding school, located in Ggaba, Kampala District.

The school covers senior one to senior six classes. It is a Universal Secondary Education (U.S.E.) school, funded by the government and the Catholic Church. 

The school is named after St. Denis Ssebugwawo, one of the Uganda Martyrs.

Location
The school is located one kilometer from the Ggaba landing site.

History
The school was started in 1984, at the same time as other schools including Kitebi S.S., Kalinabiri S.S., Luzira S.S. and Kawempe Muslim S.S. 

Until 1991, the school was located at Ggaba Demonstration Primary School. The school shifted to its present site when St. Karoli Lwanga Catholic Church Ggaba offered seven acres of land to the school.

Former head teachers

 Mr. Kateregga Charles (Omulangira) – 1984–1988
 Mr. Kiwewa Francis Xavier – 1989–1996
 Mr. Nsumba Charles Wokulira (deceased) – 1996–2005
 Ms. Achayo Christine – 2005–2009
 Mrs. Nassiwa Teddy Ddamulira – since 2010

The school's first head teacher, Mr. Kateregga Charles, helped in nurturing the school through difficult hurdles at the start

The second head teacher, Mr. Kiwewa Francis Xavier, served as head teacher from March 1989 to January 1996. He was a young teacher, promoted from the school staff. The school shifted to its current site during his leadership.  He worked with the local council officials, the community around, teachers, parents and students. One project involved making bricks manually. The school anthem and the school badge were Mr. Kiwewa's initiative.

In 1996, Mr. Nsumba Charles Wokulira (late) was transferred to St. Denis S.S Ggaba. Before his retirement in 2005, he added a two-classroom block, a laboratory and a school main hall. 

The next head teacher was Ms. Achayo Christine, who became a member of the Parliament of Uganda. She joined the school in 2004 as the deputy head teacher and later took over office in 2005. Her achievements included improved discipline and academic performance, and construction of the Magandazi block and the school playground. The school enrollment also increased and parents placed confidence in the school.

The headteacher since 2010, Mrs. Nassiwa Teddy Ddamulira has strengthened relationships between German supporters, the Ministry of Education and Sports and other well wishers. She has established a new World Bank-funded classroom and library block.

Student houses
The student houses are named after Catholic saints.

 St. Charles House
 St. Cecilia House
 St. Noah House
 St. Theresa House

Curriculum
The school follows the curriculum provided by the Ministry of Education and Sports through the National Curriculum Development Centre (NCDC). It provides both Ordinary Level and Advanced Level teaching.

The subjects taught at O-Level include:

 Biology
 Chemistry
 Physics
 Mathematics
 Geography
 History
 Christian religious education (C.R.E.)
 Agriculture
 English language
 Commerce
 Literature
 Fine art
 Luganda
 Computer studies
 Kiswahili
 Physical education

The subjects taught at A-Level include:

 Geography
 History
 Divinity
 Entrepreneurship
 Economics
 Luganda
 Literature
 Fine art
 General paper
 Functional computing
 Biology
 Physics
 Mathematics
 Agriculture
 Subsidiary mathematics

At A-level, students can choose a maximum of three subjects as a combination.

See also

 Education in Uganda
 List of boarding schools
 List of schools in Uganda
 Roman Catholicism in Uganda

References

External links
St.Denis Ssebugwawo Secondary School on Schools in Uganda

1984 establishments in Uganda
Boarding schools in Uganda

Christian schools in Uganda
Co-educational boarding schools
Educational institutions established in 1984
Kampala District
Mixed schools in Uganda
Catholic boarding schools
Catholic Church in Uganda
Catholic secondary schools in Africa
Secondary schools in Uganda

Kumusha